Marco Joseph Baron (born April 8, 1959) is a Canadian former professional ice hockey goaltender. He played in the National Hockey League (NHL) with the Boston Bruins, Los Angeles Kings, and Edmonton Oilers between 1980 and 1985.

As a youth, he played in the 1971 and 1972 Quebec International Pee-Wee Hockey Tournaments with a minor ice hockey team from Ahuntsic.

He left the NHL to play in Switzerland for HC Ambri-Piotta. He relocated to Switzerland after his retirement.

Career statistics

Regular season and playoffs

References

External links
 

1959 births
Living people
Baltimore Skipjacks players
Binghamton Dusters players
Boston Bruins draft picks
Boston Bruins players
Canadian emigrants to Switzerland
Canadian expatriate ice hockey players in Switzerland
Canadian ice hockey goaltenders
Edmonton Oilers players
Erie Blades players
Grand Rapids Owls players
HC Ambrì-Piotta players
Ice hockey people from Montreal
Los Angeles Kings players
Moncton Alpines (AHL) players
Montreal Juniors players
Nova Scotia Oilers players
Sherbrooke Canadiens players
Springfield Indians players